Saint Catherine's Monastery, officially the Sacred Autonomous Royal Monastery of Saint Katherine of the Holy and God-Trodden Mount Sinai, is an Eastern Orthodox Christian monastery located at the foot of Mount Sinai, in the Sinai Peninsula, Egypt. Built between 548 and 565, it is the oldest continuously inhabited Christian monastery in the world. 

The monastery was built by order of Emperor Justinian I, enclosing what is claimed to be the burning bush seen by Moses. Centuries later, the purported body of Saint Catherine of Alexandria, said to have been found in the area, was taken to the monastery; Saint Catherine's relics turned it into an important pilgrimage site, and the monastery was eventually renamed after the saint.

Controlled by the autonomous Church of Sinai, which is part of the wider Greek Orthodox Church, the monastery became a UNESCO World Heritage Site in 2002 for its unique importance in the traditions of Christianity, Islam, and Judaism. 

The site also holds the world's oldest continually operating library, with unique or extremely rare works, such as the Codex Sinaiticus and the Syriac Sinaiticus, as well as possibly the largest collection of early Christian icons, including the earliest known depiction of Jesus as Christ Pantocrator.

Christian traditions
The monastery was built around the location of what is traditionally considered to be the place of the burning bush seen by Moses. The patronal feast of the monastery is the Feast of the Transfiguration. 

Centuries after its foundation, the body of Saint Catherine of Alexandria was said to be found in a cave in the area. Catherine was a popular saint in Europe during the Middle Ages; her story says that, for defending Christianity, she was sentenced to death on a spiked breaking wheel, but, at her touch, the wheel shattered. It was then ordered that she was beheaded.

The relics of Saint Catherine, kept to this day inside the monastery, have made it a favorite site of pilgrimage.

History
The oldest record of monastic life at Mount Sinai comes from the travel journal written in Latin by a pilgrim woman named Egeria (Etheria; St Sylvia of Aquitaine) about 381/2–386.

The monastery was built by order of Emperor Justinian I (reigned 527–565), enclosing the Chapel of the Burning Bush (also known as "Saint Helen's Chapel") ordered to be built by Empress Consort Helena, mother of Constantine the Great, at the site where Moses is supposed to have seen the burning bush. The living bush on the grounds is purportedly the one seen by Moses. Structurally the monastery's king post truss is the oldest known surviving roof truss in the world. The site is sacred to Christianity, Islam, and Judaism.
A mosque was created by converting an existing chapel during the Fatimid Caliphate (909–1171), which was in regular use until the era of the Mamluk Sultanate in the 13th century and is still in use today on special occasions. During the Ottoman Empire, the mosque was in desolate condition; it was restored in the early 20th century.

During the seventh century, the isolated Christian anchorites of the Sinai were eliminated: only the fortified monastery remained. The monastery is still surrounded by the massive fortifications that have preserved it. Until the twentieth century, access was through a door high in the outer walls. From the time of the First Crusade, the presence of Crusaders in the Sinai until 1270 spurred the interest of European Christians and increased the number of intrepid pilgrims who visited the monastery. The monastery was supported by its dependencies in Egypt, Palestine, Syria, Crete, Cyprus and Constantinople.

The monastery, along with several dependencies in the area, constitute the entire Church of Sinai, which is headed by an archbishop, who is also the abbot of the monastery. The exact administrative status of the church within the Eastern Orthodox Church is ambiguous: by some, including the church itself, it is considered autocephalous, by others an autonomous church under the jurisdiction of the Greek Orthodox Church of Jerusalem. The archbishop is traditionally consecrated by the Greek Orthodox Patriarch of Jerusalem; in recent centuries he has usually resided in Cairo.  During the period of the Crusades which was marked by bitterness between the Orthodox and Catholic churches, the monastery was patronized by both the Byzantine emperors and the rulers of the Kingdom of Jerusalem, and their respective courts.

On April 18, 2017, an attack by the Islamic State group at a checkpoint near the Monastery killed one policeman and injured three police officers.

Manuscripts and icons

The library, founded sometime between 548 and 565, is the oldest continuously operating library in the world. The monastery library preserves the second largest collection of early codices and manuscripts in the world, outnumbered only by the Vatican Library. It contains Greek,  Christian Palestinian Aramaic, Syriac, Georgian, Arabic, Ethiopic/Ge‘ez, Latin, Armenian, Church Slavonic, and Caucasian Albanian manuscripts and books, including very rare Hebrew Language, and Coptic books.

In May 1844 and February 1859, Constantin von Tischendorf visited the monastery for research and discovered the Codex Sinaiticus, dating from the 4th century, at the time the oldest almost completely preserved manuscript of the Bible. The finding from 1859 left the monastery for Russia, in circumstances that had been long disputed. But in 2003 Russian scholars discovered the donation act for the manuscript signed by the Council of Cairo Metochion and Archbishop Callistratus on 13 November 1869. The monastery received 9000 rubles as a gift from Tsar Alexander II of Russia. The Codex was sold by Stalin in 1933 to the British Museum and is now in the British Library, London, where it is on public display. Prior to September 1, 2009, a previously unseen fragment of Codex Sinaiticus was discovered in the monastery's library, as well as among the New Finds of 1975. On other visits (1855, 1857) Constantin von Tischendorf also amassed there more valuable manuscripts (Greek, Christian Palestinian Aramaic, Georgian, Syriac) and took them with him to St Petersburg and Leipzig, where they are stored today.

In February 1892, Agnes S. Lewis discovered an early palimpsest manuscript of the Gospel in St Catherine Monastery's library that became known as the Syriac Sinaiticus and is still in the monastery's possession. Agnes and her sister Margaret D. Gibson returned in 1893 with the Cambridge team of the two scholars that included their wives, and also J. Rendel Harris to photograph and transcribe the manuscript in its entirety, as well as to prepare the first catalogues of the Syriac and Arabic manuscripts. Only among the New Finds two additional palimpsest manuscripts came to light containing additional passages of the Old Syriac Gosples.

The Monastery also has a copy of the Ashtiname of Muhammad, in which the Islamic prophet Muhammad is claimed to have bestowed his protection upon the monastery.

Additionally, the monastery houses a copy of Mok'c'evay K'art'lisay, a collection of supplementary books of the Kartlis Cxovreba, dating from the 9th century.

The most important manuscripts have since been filmed or digitized, and so are accessible to scholars. With planning assistance from Ligatus, a research center of the University of the Arts London, the library was extensively renovated, reopening at the end of 2017.

Sinai Palimpsests Project 
Since 2011, a team of imaging scientists and experienced scholars in the decipherment of palimpsest manuscripts  from the U.S. and Europe have photographed, digitized, and studied the library's collection of palimpsests during the international Sinai palimpsests project.

Palimpsests are notable for having been reused one or more times over the centuries. Since parchment was expensive and time-consuming to produce, monks would erase certain texts with orange juice or scrape them off and write over them. Though the original texts were once assumed to be lost, the imaging scientists used narrowband multispectral imaging techniques and technologies to reveal features that were difficult to see with the human eye, including ink residues and small grooves in the parchment. Each page took approximately eight minutes to scan completely. These images have subsequently been digitized and are now freely available for research at the UCLA Online Library for scholarly use.

As of June 2018, at least more than 160 palimpsests were identified, with over 6,800 pages of texts recovered. The newer finds were discovered in a secluded storage area of the St George Tower in 1975. Highlights include "108 pages of previously unknown Greek poems and the oldest-known recipe attributed to the Greek physician Hippocrates;" additional folios for the transmission of the Old Syriac Gospels; two unattested witnesses of an early Christian apocryphal text the Dormition of Mary (Transitus Mariae) of which most of the Greek text is lost; a previously unknown martyrdom of Patriklos of Caesarea Maritima (Palestine), one of the eleven followers of Pamphilus of Caesarea; as well as insight into dead languages such as the previously hardly attested Caucasian Albanian and Christian Palestinian Aramaic, the local dialect of the early Byzantine period, with many unparalleled text witnesses.

Works of art
The complex houses irreplaceable works of art: mosaics, the best collection of early icons in the world, many in encaustic, as well as liturgical objects, chalices and reliquaries, and church buildings. The large icon collection begins with a few dating to the 5th (possibly) and 6th centuries, which are unique survivals; the monastery having been untouched by Byzantine iconoclasm, and never sacked. The oldest icon on an Old Testament theme is also preserved there. A project to catalogue the collections has been ongoing since the 1960s. The monastery was an important centre for the development of the hybrid style of Crusader art, and retains over 120 icons created in the style, by far the largest collection in existence. Many were evidently created by Latins, probably monks, based in or around the monastery in the 13th century.

Icons

Historical images

See also

 Archbishop of Mount Sinai and Raithu
 Ashtiname of Muhammad
 Caucasian Albanian script
 Charnel House
 Codex Climaci Rescriptus
 Codex Sinaiticus
 Codex Sinaiticus Rescriptus
 Cyril of Jerusalem
 Desert fathers
 Gregory of Sinai
 John Climacus
 Ladder of Divine Ascent
 Oldest churches in the world
 Martyrs of Palestine
 Poustinia
 Sinaites in Serbia
 Syriac Sinaiticus
 Transitus Mariae

Explanatory notes

References

Further reading

 
 
 James Hamilton Charlesworth, The New Discoveries in St. Catherine’s Monastery (= American Schools of Oriental Research Monograph 3) Winona Lake, IN: Eisenbrauns, 1981. 

 Alessandro Falcetta (2018). A Biography of James Rendel Harris 1852 - 1941: The Daily Discoveries of a Bible Scholar and Manuscript Hunter. London: T&T Clark. 
 

 Paul Géhin (2017). Les manuscrits syriaques de parchemin du Sinaï et leur membra disjecta. CSCO 665 / Subsidia 136. Louvain: Peeters. 
 Margaret Dunlop Gibson (1893). How the Codex was Found. A Narrative of Two Visits to Sinai from Mrs. Lewis’s Journals. 1892–1893. Cambridge: Macmillan & Bowes.
 Dieter Harlfinger, Diether R. Reinsch, and Joseph A. M. Sonderkamp in Zusammenarbeit mit Giancarlo Prato: Specimina Sinaitica: Die datierten griechischen Handschriften des Katharinen-Klosters auf dem Berge Sinai 9. bis 12. Jahrhundert, Berlin: Reimer 1983. 

 Agnes Smith Lewis (1898). In the Shadow of Sinai. A Story travel and Research from 1895 to 1897. Cambridge: Macmillan & Bowes.
 Panayotis G. Nicolopoulos (1999), The New Finds. Holy Monastery and Archdiocese of Sinai (Athens). 

 David C. Parker (2010). CODEX SINAITICUS: The Story of the World’s Oldest Bible. London. British Library. 
 

 
 
 

 Elena Ene D-Vasilescu, "The Monastery of St. Catherine, Sinai and the Romanians", Revue des Études Sud-Est Européennes [Journal of South-East European studies], XLVII, 1–4, 2009, pp. 75–87

External links 

 Official Website of the Holy Monastery of St. Catherine at Mount Sinai
 Saint Catherine Area/ World Heritage Listing on UNESCO's Website
 Saint Catherine Foundation
 St. Catherine's Monastery, Sinai, Egypt
 St Catherine Project (digitisation) video
 Digitized palimpsests in St. Catherine's Monastery, Sinai
 Holy Image, Hallowed Ground: Icons from Sinai Getty exhibit
 Early Icons from Sinai, Belmont U
 St. Catherine's Monastery (Sinai) (OrthodoxWiki article)
 The text of the Charter from Muhammad can be read here or here.
 "At a Mountain Monastery, Old Texts Gain Digital Life" article from The New York Times
 Information about the town of St. Catherine
 
 Prophet Muhammad's Letter to Monks of St. Catharine Monastery
 More on Saint Catherine's Monastery and Mount Sinai
 Caucasian Albanian Alphabet: Ancient Script Discovered in the Ashes [St. Catherine's], Azerbaijan International, Vol. 11:3 (Autumn 2003), pp. 38–41.
 Article on the Orthodox Church of Mount Sinai by Ronald Roberson on the CNEWA web site
 The Albanian Script: The Process – How Its Secrets Were Revealed [St. Catherine's], Azerbaijan International, Vol. 11:3 (Autumn 2003), pp. 44–51.
 Map showing the Monastery, 18th century. Eran Laor Cartographic Collection. The National Library of Israel
 Pope Gregory X's Privilege for the Holy Monastery of St Catherine of Sinai (24 September 1274): Engineering Historical Memory. Interactive scholarly edition, Diplomatics and Historical Commentary, Deep zoom, English translation, multimodal resources mashup (publications, images, videos).

 
6th-century churches
Archives in Egypt
Buildings and structures in South Sinai Governorate
Byzantine sacred architecture
Christian monasteries established in the 6th century
Churches completed in 565
Eastern Orthodox churches in Egypt
Eastern Orthodox pilgrimage sites
Buildings of Justinian I
Mount Sinai
Palimpsests
Places associated with hesychasm
Tourist attractions in Egypt
World Heritage Sites in Egypt